Vathy (Vathý) also known as Ano Vathy (Άνω Βαθύ, upper Vathy) is an old hillside suburb of Samos Town on the island of Samos, North Aegean, Greece. Before 1958, Samos Town was known as Kato Vathy (lower Vathy) hence many islanders still often refer to all of Samos Town as Vathy. According to the 2011 census, the population of Vathy (Ano Vathy) was 1,888 while the combined population with Samos Town was 8,079.

Notable people 
Themistoklis Sophoulis (1860–1949), politician
Stefan Bogoridi (1775–1859), first prince of Samos (1834–1850)

References

External links
Official website 
Samos Travel 
Poseidon Hotel Kokkari Samos Greece 
Hotels and Studio Room Information Kokkari Samos Greece 
Anatoli Suites by Tsamadou beach, Kokkari 
Armonia bay by Tsamadou beach, Kokkari 
Houses with private swimming pools and amazing view to the Aegean - Mouzakis Villas 
Visit Samos

Populated places in Samos
Greek prefectural capitals